Bullock Pen Lake, located between Boone County and Grant County in Kentucky, is a 134 acres (54 ha) reservoir constructed in 1963 by the damming of Bullock Pen Creek. Accessibility and boat ramp located on Boat Dock Rd.

References

External links
Kentucky Department of Fish and Wildlife - Access Site Info

1963 establishments in Kentucky
Protected areas of Boone County, Kentucky
Protected areas of Grant County, Kentucky
Reservoirs in Kentucky
Bodies of water of Boone County, Kentucky
Bodies of water of Grant County, Kentucky